The 2006 FIBA Europe Under-18 Championship Division B was an international basketball  competition held in Romania in 2006.

Final ranking

1.  Romania

2.  Estonia

3.  Portugal

4.  England

5.  Sweden

6.  Poland

7.  Austria

8.  Belgium

9.  Bosnia and Herzegovina

10.  Czech Republic

11.  Hungary

12.  Finland

13.  Norway

14.  Netherlands

15.  Slovakia

16.  Luxembourg

17.  Moldova

18.  Scotland

19.  Ireland

Awards

External links
FIBA Archive

FIBA U18 European Championship Division B
2006–07 in European basketball
2006–07 in Romanian basketball
International youth basketball competitions hosted by Romania